Carex infuscata is a tussock-forming species of perennial sedge in the family Cyperaceae. It is native to parts of Asia from Afghanistan in the west to China in the east.

See also
List of Carex species

References

infuscata
Plants described in 1834
Taxa named by Christian Gottfried Daniel Nees von Esenbeck
Flora of China
Flora of Nepal
Flora of Afghanistan
Flora of Pakistan